Thalatha Wijerathna also spelt as Thalatha Wijeratne is a Sri Lankan children's book author and educator. She has written and published two novels for the children.

Career 
She graduated in science from the University of Peradeniya where she also obtained her Master of Arts in higher education. After graduation, she pursued her career as a school teacher and served as a high school teacher for over 36 years. She also served as a member of the Translator's Pool of the Official Languages Department of Sri Lanka. After her retirement, she pursued her interest in writing and publishing novels.

She published her first children's novel in 2018 titled Little Heroes of Randeniya. The novel was based on an adventure embarked by 3 children Wasantha, Samantha and Sarath and it revolves around how the lives of the children and their future shape up the legacy of the tiny village Randeniya. It was deemed as a milestone as well as a landmark novel of young adult literature in Sri Lanka. The novel also became a finalist in the children's category of the 2019 International Book Awards.

In 2020, she published her second novel titled An Adventure of the Little Heroes which was incidentally the sequel of her previous novel Little Heroes of Randeniya.

References 

Living people
20th-century novelists
21st-century journalists
Sinhalese academics
Sri Lankan educators
Sinhalese writers
Sri Lankan novelists
Sri Lankan Buddhists
People from British Ceylon
Year of birth missing (living people)